Union Beach is a borough in Monmouth County, New Jersey, United States. As of the 2010 United States Census, the borough's population was 6,245, reflecting a decline of 404 (−6.1%) from the 6,649 counted in the 2000 Census, which had in turn increased by 493 (+8.0%) from the 6,156 counted in the 1990 Census.

Union Beach was formed as a borough by an act of the New Jersey Legislature on March 16, 1925, from portions of Raritan Township (now Hazlet), based on the results of a referendum held on April 16, 1925. A  farm in the future borough was owned by the Poole family since the days of the American Revolutionary War. Following the development of the Central Railroad of New Jersey, the Poole Farm became the site of the Union Subdivision in 1908, while an area that had been called East Point Beach Estates was renamed Union Beach by developer Charles Carr in 1920.

The borough is part of the Bayshore Regional Strategic Plan, an effort by nine municipalities in northern Monmouth County to reinvigorate the area's economy by emphasizing the traditional downtowns, dense residential neighborhoods, maritime history, and the natural beauty of the Raritan Bayshore coastline.

Geography
According to the United States Census Bureau, the borough had a total area of 1.88 square miles (4.87 km2), including 1.78 square miles (4.61 km2) of land and 0.10 square miles (0.26 km2) of water (5.32%).

Union Beach has undergone extensive restoration of its beach front, which offers a view of the New York City skyline and the Verazanno-Narrows Bridge.

A monument to the victims of the September 11, 2001 terrorist attacks, constructed of black stone and dedicated in June 2002, is positioned to allow visitors to see past the memorial towards the location where the World Trade Center towers were visible from the borough.

Unincorporated communities, localities and place names within the borough include Lorrillard Beach, Natco, Union Gardens and Van Marters Corner.

The borough borders the Monmouth County municipalities of Hazlet, Keansburg (maritime border) and Keyport.

History

Hurricane Sandy
On October 28, 2012, at 4:00pm, the mayor issued a mandatory evacuation for the borough in preparation for Hurricane Sandy—the second-costliest hurricane in United States history. When the hurricane arrived, approximately one third of the borough's 6,200 residents had left.<ref>Chesler, Caren. "Down by the Bayshore: Charting Raritan Bay's Recovery; Hurricane Sandy is just the latest calamity to strike the tough old towns along the Raritan Bay. From Keyport to Keansburg to Highlands, here's how they're bouncing back.", New Jersey Monthly', May 7, 2013. Accessed July 24, 2015.</ref>

An additional 100 that had shifted off foundations and were no longer habitable. The borough's police department borrowed several police cruisers from other municipalities such as Wilmington, NC and Clay County, Florida. Most cars were destroyed when flooding reached police headquarters. Former residents from around the country mobilized and organized relief efforts: sending relief supplies; including advising and assisting public servants in acquiring replacements of lost emergency vehicles. In total, the borough lost 14 police cars, three ambulances and four fire trucks. Madison Township and Wanaque each gave repurposed police cruisers fully decaled with Union Beach logos, as well as other relief. Some local agencies sold old police cruisers for one dollar each or donated police cars, and donations of two cars each came from North Carolina and Florida. EMS and fire trucks were also donated from near and far.

Jakeabob's Bay, a restaurant and waterfront tiki bar and one of the major employers in town, which survived Hurricane Irene in 2011, was destroyed in the hurricane. The storm surge completely washed through the building, pushing out tables, chairs, menus and displays. The restaurant owner, Gigi Liaguno-Dorr, organized the relief and rebuilding efforts for Union Beach. The building was razed when the insurance companies that covered the restaurant would not pay out. A new temporary restaurant was built but did not manage to renew its lease due to insurance disputes with the Federal Emergency Management Agency.

Union Beach Memorial School, the borough's only school, was inundated with floodwaters and debris when the storm surge and extreme high tide swept through the borough.Staff. "Transforming a School, Rebuilding a Community After Hurricane Sandy", Points of Light, October 30, 2013. Accessed May 7, 2015. The school had been used as an evacuation center but began taking on water as the storm raged. Hundreds of library books and teaching materials were destroyed along with thousands of dollars worth of instruments. After several months of emergency repairs by volunteers, including students and teachers, the renovations including new floors, walls, desks and murals were finished prior to the end of the school year.

Demographics

Census 2010

The Census Bureau's 2006–2010 American Community Survey showed that (in 2010 inflation-adjusted dollars) median household income was $61,347 (with a margin of error of +/− $10,084) and the median family income was $76,744 (+/− $15,912). Males had a median income of $55,000 (+/− $5,759) versus $36,002 (+/− $3,887) for females. The per capita income for the borough was $24,982 (+/− $1,875). About 3.1% of families and 4.9% of the population were below the poverty line, including 3.4% of those under age 18 and 4.0% of those age 65 or over.

Census 2000
As of the 2000 United States Census there were 6,649 people, 2,143 households, and 1,722 families residing in the borough. The population density was 3,545.1 people per square mile (1,365.5/km2). There were 2,229 housing units at an average density of 1,188.5 per square mile (457.8/km2). The racial makeup of the borough was 94.45% White, 0.87% African American (U.S. Census), 0.20% Native American, 1.23% Asian, 1.35% from other races, and 1.90% from two or more races. Hispanic or Latino of any race were 8.09% of the population.DP-1: Profile of General Demographic Characteristics: 2000 - Census 2000 Summary File 1 (SF 1) 100-Percent Data for Union Beach borough, Monmouth County, New Jersey , United States Census Bureau. Accessed July 15, 2012.

There were 2,143 households, out of which 43.3% had children under the age of 18 living with them, 62.7% were married couples living together, 12.2% had a female householder with no husband present, and 19.6% were non-families. 15.5% of all households were made up of individuals, and 5.5% had someone living alone who was 65 years of age or older. The average household size was 3.09 and the average family size was 3.44.

In the borough the population was spread out, with 29.1% under the age of 18, 8.3% from 18 to 24, 33.0% from 25 to 44, 22.1% from 45 to 64, and 7.5% who were 65 years of age or older. The median age was 34 years. For every 100 females, there were 102.0 males. For every 100 females age 18 and over, there were 97.9 males.

The median income for a household in the borough was $59,946, and the median income for a family was $65,179. Males had a median income of $45,688 versus $29,918 for females. The per capita income for the borough was $20,973. 4.8% of the population and 4.2% of families were below the poverty line.  Out of the total people living in poverty, 5.6% were under the age of 18 and 5.9% were 65 or older.

Government

Local government
Union Beach is governed under the Borough form of New Jersey municipal government, which is used in 218 municipalities (of the 564) statewide, making it the most common form of government in New Jersey. The governing body is comprised of a Mayor and a Borough Council, with all positions elected at-large on a partisan basis as part of the November general election. A Mayor is elected directly by the voters to a four-year term of office. The Borough Council is comprised of six members elected to serve three-year terms on a staggered basis, with two seats coming up for election each year in a three-year cycle. The Borough form of government used by Union Beach is a "weak mayor / strong council" government in which council members act as the legislative body with the mayor presiding at meetings and voting only in the event of a tie. The mayor can veto ordinances subject to an override by a two-thirds majority vote of the council. The mayor makes committee and liaison assignments for council members, and most appointments are made by the mayor with the advice and consent of the council."Forms of Municipal Government in New Jersey", p. 6. Rutgers University Center for Government Studies. Accessed June 3, 2015.

, the Mayor of Union Beach is Republican Charles W. Cocuzza, who was elected to serve a term of office ending December 31, 2023. Members of the Borough Council are Council President Albin J. Wicki (R, 2024), Louis S. Andreuzzi (R, 2023), Anthony Cavallo (R, 2022), Albert E. Lewandowski (R, 2022), Cherlanne Roche (R, 2023) and Eileen Woodruff (R, 2024).2022 Municipal Data Sheet, Borough of Union Beach. Accessed August 10, 2022.November 3, 2020 General Election Official Results, Monmouth County, New Jersey, updated November 3, 2020. Accessed January 1, 2021.

In May 2020, the Borough Council appointed Albin J. Wicki to fill the seat expiring in December 2023 that had been held by Paul J. Smith Jr. until his death the previous month. In the November 2020 general election, Charles W. Cocuzza was elected to serve the balance of the term of office.

Federal, state and county representation
Union Beach is located in the 6th Congressional District and is part of New Jersey's 13th state legislative district.2019 New Jersey Citizen's Guide to Government, New Jersey League of Women Voters. Accessed October 30, 2019.

 

Monmouth County is governed by a Board of County Commissioners comprised of five members who are elected at-large to serve three year terms of office on a staggered basis, with either one or two seats up for election each year as part of the November general election. At an annual reorganization meeting held in the beginning of January, the board selects one of its members to serve as Director and another as Deputy Director. , Monmouth County's Commissioners are
Commissioner Director Thomas A. Arnone (R, Neptune City, term as commissioner and as director ends December 31, 2022), 
Commissioner Deputy Director Susan M. Kiley (R, Hazlet Township, term as commissioner ends December 31, 2024; term as deputy commissioner director ends 2022),
Lillian G. Burry (R, Colts Neck Township, 2023),
Nick DiRocco (R, Wall Township, 2022), and 
Ross F. Licitra (R, Marlboro Township, 2023).Board of County Commissioners, Monmouth County, New Jersey. Accessed July 19, 2022. 
Constitutional officers elected on a countywide basis are
County clerk Christine Giordano Hanlon (R, 2025; Ocean Township),Members List:Clerks, Constitutional Officers Association of New Jersey. Accessed July 19, 2022. 
Sheriff Shaun Golden (R, 2022; Howell Township)Members List: Sheriffs, Constitutional Officers Association of New Jersey. Accessed July 19, 2022. and 
Surrogate Rosemarie D. Peters (R, 2026; Middletown Township).Members List: Surrogates, Constitutional Officers Association of New Jersey. Accessed July 19, 2022.

Politics
As of March 23, 2011, there were a total of 3,782 registered voters in Union Beach, of which 887 (23.5%) were registered as Democrats, 667 (17.6%) were registered as Republicans and 2,228 (58.9%) were registered as Unaffiliated. There were no voters registered to other parties.

In the 2012 presidential election, Democrat Barack Obama received 52.6% of the vote (1,109 cast), ahead of Republican Mitt Romney with 46.3% (976 votes), and other candidates with 1.0% (22 votes), among the 2,119 ballots cast by the borough's 3,857 registered voters (12 ballots were spoiled), for a turnout of 54.9%. In the 2008 presidential election, Republican John McCain received 53.2% of the vote (1,490 cast), ahead of Democrat Barack Obama with 43.9% (1,229 votes) and other candidates with 1.5% (41 votes), among the 2,802 ballots cast by the borough's 4,103 registered voters, for a turnout of 68.3%. In the 2004 presidential election, Republican George W. Bush received 56.2% of the vote (1,569 ballots cast), outpolling Democrat John Kerry with 42.0% (1,172 votes) and other candidates with 0.9% (37 votes), among the 2,793 ballots cast by the borough's 4,114 registered voters, for a turnout percentage of 67.9.

In the 2013 gubernatorial election, Republican Chris Christie received 73.6% of the vote (1,099 cast), ahead of Democrat Barbara Buono with 24.2% (362 votes), and other candidates with 2.1% (32 votes), among the 1,520 ballots cast by the borough's 3,642 registered voters (27 ballots were spoiled), for a turnout of 41.7%. In the 2009 gubernatorial election, Republican Chris Christie received 65.5% of the vote (1,152 ballots cast), ahead of  Democrat Jon Corzine with 24.6% (432 votes), Independent Chris Daggett with 7.7% (136 votes) and other candidates with 1.7% (30 votes), among the 1,759 ballots cast by the borough's 3,917 registered voters, yielding a 44.9% turnout.

Education
The Union Beach School System serves public school students in pre-kindergarten through eighth grade at Union Beach Memorial School. As of the 2019–20 school year, the district, comprised of one school, had an enrollment of 640 students and 61.7 classroom teachers (on an FTE basis), for a student–teacher ratio of 10.4:1.

Public school students in ninth through twelfth grades attend Keyport High School in Keyport, as part of a sending/receiving relationship with the Keyport Public Schools. As of the 2019–20 school year, the high school had an enrollment of 373 students and 36.5 classroom teachers (on an FTE basis), for a student–teacher ratio of 10.2:1.

Students have the choice to apply for Red Bank Regional High School for admission into its specialized programs. High school students also have the option to apply to one of the career academies in the Monmouth County Vocational School District.

Transportation

Roads and highways

Route 36 runs along the borough's southern border with Hazlet Township.

Public transportation
NJ Transit local bus service is available on the 817 route.

Controversy
Union Beach made national news for fighting a wind turbine proposed by the Bayshore Regional Sewerage Authority that would be constructed in close proximity to residential houses, sensitive bird habitats, and protected wetlands. The case was brought to the Supreme Court of New Jersey, which in September 2014 upheld a state law disallowing local ordinances from preventing the development of certain wind power projects in New Jersey.

Notable people

People who were born in, residents of, or otherwise closely associated with Union Beach include:

 Paul Bacon (born 1923), designer of book and album covers
 Skip O'Brien (1950–2011), actor who had a recurring role on CSI: Crime Scene Investigation''

In popular culture
Union Beach was used as the eighth checkpoint of the titular race in the seventh part of the popular manga series, Jojo's Bizarre Adventure.

References

External links

 Union Beach information and community calendar
 Union Beach School District
 
 School Data for the Union Beach School District, National Center for Education Statistics

 
1925 establishments in New Jersey
Borough form of New Jersey government
Boroughs in Monmouth County, New Jersey
Populated places established in 1925
Raritan Bayshore